Hoylake is a seaside town in the Metropolitan Borough of Wirral, Merseyside, England. It is at the north west of the Wirral Peninsula, near West Kirby and where the River Dee meets the Irish Sea. Historically part of Cheshire, the Domesday Book of 1086 recorded it within the Hundred of Wilaveston.

At the 2001 census, the population of Hoylake was 5,710  of a total population of 13,042, as part of the Hoylake and Meols local government ward. 
By the time of the 2011 census specific population figures for Hoylake were no longer maintained. The total population for the Hoylake and Meols Ward at this census was 13,348.

History
In 1690, William III set sail from Hoylake, then known as Hyle or High-lake, with a 10,000-strong army to Ireland, where his army was to take part in the Battle of the Boyne. The location of departure remains known as King's Gap. The previous year a large force under Marshal Schomberg had also departed from Hoylake on 12 August, crossing to Ireland to capture Carrickfergus.

The present day township grew up in the nineteenth century around the small fishing village of Hoose, 
the name of which means "hollows".
The 1848 Topographical Dictionary of England described the inhabitants of Hoose as:

The name Hoylake was derived from Hoyle Lake, a channel of water between Hilbre Island and Dove Point.  Protected by a wide sandbank known as Hoyle Bank and with a water depth of about 20 feet, it provided a safe anchorage for ships too large to sail up the Dee to Chester.

Civic history
The township of Hoose was part of the West Kirby Parish of the Wirral Hundred. It existed as a civil parish between 1866 and 1894 when it was merged into Hoylake and West Kirby  civil parish. 
Between 1894 and 1974 Hoylake was governed by its own urban district council. 
On 1 April 1974, local government reorganisation in England and Wales resulted in most of the Wirral Peninsula, including Hoylake, transfer from the county of Cheshire to the nascent county of Merseyside.

The population of the town over time was measured at 60 in 1801, 589 in 1851 and 2,701 in 1901. The total population of the Hoylake Urban District (which included West Kirby) was recorded as 19,745 in 1931.

Landmarks
The Hoylake and West Kirby War Memorial is a notable local landmark, as it was designed in 1922 by the British sculptor Charles Sargeant Jagger who was responsible for a number of war memorials around the world, including the Royal Artillery Memorial at Hyde Park Corner in London.

The former Town Hall, on the corner of Albert Road and Market Street, is due to be converted to a new arts centre, known as The Beacon, with craft workshops, restaurant, and flats above.

Kings Gap roundabout is home to a sculpture by Scottish sculptor David Annand. Called 'Knots', it consists of seabirds looping around four poles. It was commissioned by the council as part of the regeneration of Hoylake and was installed in June 2006 in time for the 2006 Open Championship.

Lighthouses

To facilitate safe access into the Hoylake anchorage, two lighthouses were constructed in 1763, at the initiative of William Hutchinson. The lower light was a wooden structure that could be moved according to differing tides and shifting sands to remain aligned to the upper light, which was a permanent brick building. By the start of the 19th century each lighthouse was equipped with a single 3 ft-diameter reflector, built to Hutchinson's design.

Both of these structures were rebuilt a century later, and in 1865 new lenses (a pair of fourth-order fixed optics) were designed and manufactured for the two towers by James Chance. 
The upper lighthouse, consisting of an octagonal brick tower, last shone on 14 May 1886 and is now part of a private residence in Valentia Road. 
The building was given Grade II listed status in 1988.
The lower lighthouse, closer to the shore in Alderley Road, was deactivated in 1908 and demolished in 1922.

Former landmarks
The Royal Hotel was built by Sir John Stanley in 1792, with the intention of developing the area as a holiday resort. The numerous steam packet vessels sailing between Liverpool and North Wales which called at the hotel provided valuable patronage. By the mid-19th century a racecourse was laid out in the grounds of the hotel. The hotel building was demolished in the 1950s.

Hoylake's lido, located on the promenade, was opened in June 1913 and rebuilt in the late 1920s. In 1976, the Hoylake Pool and Community Trust took over the running of the facility from Wirral Borough Council.
The baths finally closed in 1981.

Geography
Hoylake is at the north-western corner of the Wirral Peninsula, and is situated on the eastern side of the mouth of the Dee Estuary and adjacent to the Irish Sea.

To the west of the town at Hilbre Point is Red Rocks, a designated Site of Special Scientific Interest. The area is an exposed sandstone outcrop consisting of sand dunes, brackish marsh and reed beds.

Governance
Hoylake is within the parliamentary constituency of Wirral West. The current Member of Parliament is Margaret Greenwood, a Labour representative.

At local government level, the town is incorporated into the Hoylake and Meols Ward of the Metropolitan Borough of Wirral, in the metropolitan county of Merseyside. It is represented on Wirral Metropolitan Borough Council by three councillors. 
The most recent local elections took place on 6 May 2021.

Community

Hoylake is a largely residential area and there is an active nightlife in the town centre, which is located at the original village of Hoose.

The town supports a permanent lifeboat station, manned by the RNLI. Initially founded in 1803 by the Mersey Docks and Harbour Board, it is one of the oldest in the country. 
In 2008, the RNLI began to raise £2 million for a new lifeboat station and new generation all-weather lifeboat, to facilitate a faster response time to emergencies and rescues in the Irish Sea and the rivers Dee and Mersey. The building was opened in November 2009.

The Kings Gap conservation area has been designated by Wirral Borough Council. Bounded by the coastline and the Royal Liverpool Golf Club, it consists of large nineteenth and early twentieth century houses, Hoylake Lighthouse and St Hildeburgh's Church.

Education
Hoylake includes the independent Kingsmead School, which educates girls and boys from 2 to 16 years old. Hoylake Holy Trinity C of E Primary School is the town's main primary school, educating children from the ages of 3 to 11.

Sport

Golf

Hoylake is the home of the Royal Liverpool Golf Club, built in 1869 on the site of the Royal Hotel racecourse. It is the second oldest golf links in England, predated only by the Royal North Devon Golf Club, in Westward Ho!, Devon. 
It has hosted many major tournaments such as the Open Championship and the Walker Cup. The club is often referred to as "Hoylake". It hosted the Open again in July 2006, after a gap of almost 40 years, with Tiger Woods earning the Claret Jug for the second year in a row. The 2014 Open Championship is the most recent of the event to be held at Hoylake. This was won by Rory McIlroy. The Open is due to return to the course for the 13th time in 2023.

Hoylake-born amateur golfer John Ball Jnr. won the Open in 1890, becoming the first Englishman to do so. Another local amateur, Harold Hilton became Open champion two years later. He won again in 1897 at his home club of Royal Liverpool.

On the other side of Meols Drive and the railway is Hoylake Municipal Golf course which is used by Hoylake Golf Club (since 1933), West Hoyle GC and Irby GC. It was used as the 2006 Open Championship practice course.

Rugby Union
Hoylake RFC rugby club was founded in 1922. They currently play in South Lancs/Cheshire Division One, the seventh tier of English rugby. Its predecessor, connected with the Royal Liverpool Golf Club, had been founded in the 1890s. British Open golf champion Harold Hilton was also captain of the rugby team for the 1890–91 season.

Swimming
Hoylake ASC was founded in 1931. The club now trains at the West Kirby Concourse and the Calday Grange Swimming Pool.

Sailing

Hoylake Sailing Club was founded in 1887 and has a clubhouse and boatyard on North Parade. The club hosts an annual regatta and sends a team to the Southport 24 Hour Race.

Sand yachting
Hoylake is one of the premier sites for sand yachting in Britain, with banks around a quarter of a mile offshore. The town's beach was the venue for the European Sand Yacht Championships in 2007 and 2011 and hosted the 2017 event with Laytown & Bettystown, County Meath.

Cricket
Cricket was played at the now disused Ellerman Lines Cricket Ground from as early as the 1920s, when the then newly formed West Wirral Cricket Club played at the ground. It was later sold to Ellerman Lines, who transformed the site into their social club. Cheshire played minor counties cricket there from 1957 to 1968. The ground also held Cheshire's first ever appearance in List A cricket against Surrey in the first round of the 1964 Gillette Cup.

The ground was later sold, with the site becoming a nightclub, before being demolished following a fire. In 2011 the site of the ground was selected for construction of 62 affordable homes. Planning permission for this, and a revised plan for 26 properties, were refused. In 2020 a further planning proposal was submitted for 30 semi-detached bungalows and up to 61 assisted living retirement apartments.

Transport
Hoylake and Manor Road railway stations serve the town. Both are on the West Kirby branch of Merseyrail's Wirral line.

Notable people
Joshua Armitage, pen-name "Ionicus" (1913–1998), the "Punch" artist and designer of covers for Penguin's editions of P.G. Wodehouse, was born in Hoylake and lived and worked there his whole life.
Julian Budden, Italian opera scholar and BBC radio producer (1924–2007) was born in Hoylake.
The former Olympic Games cyclist Chris Boardman (1968- ) was born in Hoylake.
Actor Daniel Craig (1968- ) grew up in Hoylake.
Lieutenant Colonel Jack Armand Cunningham (1890–1966), the World War I flying ace, retired to Hoylake and eventually died there.
Author Helen Forrester (1919-2011) was born in the town.
Pianist Stephen Hough (1961- ) grew up in Hoylake.
Pianist Stephen Coombs (1960- ) grew up in Hoylake.
The former actress and Labour MP Glenda Jackson (1936- ) grew up in Hoylake.
John Lennon's first wife Cynthia grew up in Hoylake and returned there after their divorce in 1968. Their son Julian (1963- ) spent much of his early life in Hoylake.
Comedian Eric Morecambe won a local amateur talent contest, held at Hoylake's Kingsway Cinema in 1940.
Mike Rutherford (1950- ) of Genesis was a boarder at the Leas School, formerly on Meols Drive.
Curtis Warren (1963- ), Merseyside gangster, formerly featured in the Sunday Times Rich List, owned a house on Meols Drive.
Cliff Williams (1949- ), bassist of AC/DC grew up in Hoylake.
Indie rock bands the Rascals and the Little Flames are from Hoylake.
James Skelly, Ian Skelly, Bill Ryder-Jones, Nick Power, Lee Southall, Paul Duffy and John Duffy, from the band the Coral, were also brought up there.

See also
Listed buildings in Hoylake
Hoylake Holy Trinity C of E Primary School
Hoylake Holy Trinity Church
Hoylake Parade Community Centre

Notes

References

Further reading

External links

Hoylake Lifeboat
Hoylake Village Life
Hoylake Vision Community Planning Forum

Towns in Merseyside
Towns and villages in the Metropolitan Borough of Wirral
Seaside resorts in England
Beaches of Merseyside
Unparished areas in Merseyside